The 1999 WNBA Championship was the championship series of the 1999 WNBA season, and the conclusion of the season's playoffs. The Houston Comets, top-seeded champions of the Western Conference, defeated the New York Liberty, top-seeded champions of the Eastern Conference, two games to one in a best-of-three series. This was Houston's third title.

The Comets made their third appearance in the Finals in franchise history. The Liberty made their second Finals appearance.

Going into the series, no other team except the Houston Comets had ever won a WNBA championship (1997 and 1998).

The Comets had a 26–6 record (.813), good enough to receive home-court advantage over the Liberty (18–14).

Road to the finals

Regular season series
The Comets and the Liberty split the regular season series:

Game summaries
All times listed below are Eastern Daylight Time.

Game 1

Game 2

With Houston leading 67–65 over New York and the Liberty out of timeouts with only 2.4 seconds remaining on the clock after Tina Thompson's jumper, New York would have to go the length of the court if they had any hope of winning. Kym Hampton inbounded the ball to Teresa Weatherspoon who took a couple dribbles and let the ball fly 50 feet away from the basket. To the awe and ire of the Houston fans, the ball smacked off the backboard and banked into the basket and the Liberty won the game 68–67. The lasting image of this moment is Weatherspoon falling over on the ground smiling as her teammates mob her from the bench.

Game 3

Awards
1999 WNBA Champion: Houston Comets
Finals MVP: Cynthia Cooper

Rosters

{| class="toccolours" style="font-size: 95%; width: 100%;"
|-
! colspan="2" style="background-color: #B22222; color: #D3D3D3; text-align: center;" | 1999 Houston Comets Finals roster
|- style="background-color: #D3D3D3;color: #FFFFFF; text-align: center;"
! Players !! Coaches
|-
| valign="top" |
{| class="sortable" style="background:transparent; margin:0px; width:100%;"
! Pos. !! # !! Nat. !! Name !! Height !! Weight !!class="unsortable"| !! From
|-

{| class="toccolours" style="font-size: 95%; width: 100%;"
|-
! colspan="2" style="background-color: #0047AB; color: #FFFFFF; text-align: center;" | 1999 New York Liberty Finals roster
|- style="background-color: #66CDAA;color: #FF4500; text-align: center;"
! Players !! Coaches
|-
| valign="top" |
{| class="sortable" style="background:transparent; margin:0px; width:100%;"
! Pos. !! # !! Nat. !! Name !! Height !! Weight !!class="unsortable"| !! From
|-

External links

Finals
Houston Comets
New York Liberty
WNBA Championship
WNBA Championship
Women's National Basketball Association Finals
WNBA Championship
WNBA Championship
Basketball competitions in Houston
Basketball competitions in New York City
1990s in Manhattan